Valentine Elementary School District 22 is a public school district based in Mohave County, Arizona.

It consists of a single K-8 school, Valentine Elementary School, in Truxton, with a Peach Springs postal address.  its student body was fewer in number than 100, with 84% of them being Native Americans, with many of them from the Hualapai Indian Reservation, which is outside of the district. That year, there were about 14 employees.

The district serves Truxton, Valentine, Crozier, and a section of Hackberry.

History
Originally located in Valentine, the school was established in 1924. In 1969 the school began classes in its current location.

References

External links
 

School districts in Mohave County, Arizona
1924 establishments in Arizona
Public K–8 schools in Arizona
School districts established in 1924